Günter Jena (born 1933) is a German choral conductor and musicologist. He was the director of church music at St. Michaelis in Hamburg from 1973 to 1997. He founded the festival Bach-Tage Hamburg, and provided music for ballet performances of choreographer John Neumeier at the Hamburg State Opera, including Bach's St Matthew Passion.

Career 
Born in Leipzig, Jena attended the Thomasschule there, and then studied musicology. He studied psychology and philosophy in Berlin, and conducting and organ at the Musikhochschule München with Karl Richter, becoming his assistant.

In 1969 he founded the festival . From 1973 he was the church musician at Hamburg's Hauptkirche St. Michaelis, where he regularly conducted performances of works by Bach, music from the classical period and the romantic period. He founded the festival Bach-Tage Hamburg, and was appointed Kirchenmusikdirektor (director of church music) for the region. Jena prepared choir and orchestra for performances by the choreographer John Neumeier at the Hamburgische Staatsoper, including Bach's St Matthew Passion in 1981 and Mozart's Requiem. Jena conducted the performances for the premieres, and also a revival of the St Matthew Passion in 2013, now in his church. The 200th performance of the production was given on Good Friday 2017.

Jena prepared and conducted the NDR Chor for a recording of the complete a cappella works by Johannes Brahms from 1981. It includes works such as Fünf Gesänge, Op. 104. Jena retired in 1997. He published books about the musicological and theological background of Bach's Christmas Oratorio, The Art of Fugue and St Matthew Passion. He is a member of the Freie Akademie der Künste Hamburg.

Awards 
Jena was awarded the Würzburg Cultural Prize in 1970. The  appointed him an honorary professor in 1986 and awarded him the music prize Johannes Brahms Medal in 1987.

Publications 
Publications by Jena are held by the German National Library:
 "Das gehet meiner Seele nah". Die Matthäuspassion von Johann Sebastian Bach. Piper Verlag 1993, Herder Verlag, Freiburg 1999
 "Brich an, o schönes Morgenlicht". Das Weihnachtsoratorium von Johann Sebastian Bach. 1997
 Ich lebe mein Leben in wachsenden Ringen, 2000

Selected recordings 
Recordings by Jena are held by the German National Library:
Johannes Brahms, Chorwerke. NDR Chor.
Johann Sebastian Bach, Weihnachtsoratorium. Choir and orchestra of St. Michaelis, Lynne Dawson, Marjana Lipovšek, Peter Schreier, Andreas Schmidt. 1997

References

External links 
 
 
 Günter Jena (in German) weihnachtsoratorium-oper.de
 
 
 Five partsongs (Gesämge) for mixed chorus, Op. 104 kellydeanhansen.com

German male conductors (music)
Choral conductors
1933 births
Living people
Musicians from Leipzig
University of Music and Performing Arts Munich alumni
University of Music and Theatre Leipzig alumni
Humboldt University of Berlin alumni
21st-century German conductors (music)
21st-century German male musicians
Kirchenmusikdirektor